The Gambia made its Paralympic Games début at the 2012 Summer Paralympics in London, United Kingdom, from August 29 to September 9.

The Gambia National Paralympic Committee selected two athletes. Ida Nyang (female) and Demba Jarju (male) both competed in track and field events, training for the 100, 200, and 800 metres races. Both are wheelchair athletes, and competed in wheelchairs donated by the Swiss Paralympic Committee. Jarju qualified for the Games by meeting the qualification targets, while Nyang received a wild card invitation to take part.

Athletics 

Men's Track and Road Events

Women's Track and Road Events

See also
The Gambia at the Paralympics
The Gambia at the 2012 Summer Olympics

Notes

Nations at the 2012 Summer Paralympics
2012
Paralympics